Puerto Esperanza may refer to:

Puerto Esperanza, Misiones, a village and municipality in Misiones Province in north-eastern Argentina
Esperanza, Ucayali, also known as Puerto Esperanza, a town in Peru, capital of Purús Province in Ucayali Region
Puerto Esperanza Airport serving the town Esperanza, Ucayali, Peru